A by-election for the seat of Sydney-King in the New South Wales Legislative Assembly was held on 11 August 1894 because George Reid had been appointed Premier and Colonial Treasurer, forming the Reid ministry. Such ministerial by-elections were usually uncontested and four ministers were re-elected unopposed, James Brunker (East Maitland), Joseph Carruthers (St George), Jacob Garrard (Sherbrooke) and James Young (The Manning). A poll was required in Bathurst (Sydney Smith), Hartley (Joseph Cook), Singleton (Albert Gould) and Sydney-King however all were comfortably re-elected.

Dates

Result

George Reid was appointed Premier and Colonial Treasurer, forming the Reid ministry.

See also
Electoral results for the district of Sydney-King
List of New South Wales state by-elections

Notes

References

1894 elections in Australia
New South Wales state by-elections
1890s in New South Wales